MV Transportation, Inc., based in Dallas, Texas., is the largest privately-owned passenger transportation contracting services firm in the United States. The company can provide paratransit, fixed-route, campus and corporate shuttles, and student transportation services, partnering with over 200 city and county government transit agencies, school districts, universities, and corporations.   MV serves over 110 million passengers each year across 30 states and Canada with a team of more than 20,000 transit professionals.

History
MV Transportation, Inc., was founded in 1975 in San Francisco, California, by Alex and Feysan Lodde, who continue to own the company. The Loddes realized the limited transportation options for the elderly and people with disabilities and began providing transportation services throughout the city.  By 1990, the landmark Americans with Disabilities Act was passed, mandating comparable transportation for passengers with disabilities.

Since that time MV has grown, now generating over $1.3B in 2022 annual revenues and representing more than 200 public transit agencies and private companies in performing their passenger transportation service in both the U.S. and Canada. It is the largest privately-owned transportation company in North America, providing paratransit, fixed route, shuttle and school transportation services.
.

Company milestones
1978: incorporated in the State of California as MediVan
1984: the company won its first government contract
1990: name changed from MediVan to MV Transportation, Inc.
2001: MV won its first contract outside of its home state, California
2004: MV is named one of America's fastest growing companies by Inc. Magazine
2004: MV debuted on Black Enterprise Magazine's B.E. 100 list as the 16th largest Black-owned  company in the United States
2004: MV was awarded Microsoft's employee shuttle contract
2005: MV was awarded $500+ million contract in Washington D.C., largest in company history
2008: MV won the TransLink paratransit contract in Vancouver, British Columbia, the company's first contract outside the United States.
2010: MV Transportation was celebrated by client, Bechtel Corporation for its work at Motiva Refinery in Port Arthur, Texas. The MV division drove one million miles and carried one million passengers at the site.
2012: MV Transportation relocated its global headquarters from Fairfield, California to Dallas, Texas.

Transit operations

 Anchor-Rides, Anchorage, AK
 Anchorage School District Anchorage, AK 
 Austin, Texas, Capital Metro (MetroAccess)
 Antelope Valley Transit Authority
 Barrie Transit (Ontario, Canada)
 Barstow Area Transit
 Burbank Bus
 CalTrain Shuttles
 Cape Cod Regional Transit Authority
 City of Santa Clarita Transit
 Coastside Beach Shuttle, Half Moon Bay, CA
 Compton Renaissance Transit
 Dumbarton Express
 Durham Area Transit Authority
 Detroit Department of Transportation
 E-tran
 Emery Go-Round
 Fairfax Connector July 2009 - June 2019 
 Foothill Transit
 Fresno Area Express (Contractor for Paratransit Operations)
 Glendale Beeline
 GoCary
 Indianapolis Public Transportation Corporation (Contractor for Paratransit Operations)
 Los Angeles County Metropolitan Transportation Authority Los Angeles, CA (Southbay Lines)
 LADOT (Los Angeles)
 Lawrence Transit
 Lawrence Berkeley National Laboratory
 Marin Transit
 Contractor for West Marin Stagecoach
 MTA Maryland
 Monterey Park Spirit Bus
 Monterey-Salinas Transit
 Contractor for paratransit, minibus, and tourist-trolley routes
 North County Transit District (Bus system only)
 NYC MTA (Subcontractor for Access-A-Ride program in Brooklyn, Staten Island and Harlem)
 Orange County Transportation Authority (ACCESS Only)
 Pueblo Transit CitiLift
 Petaluma Transit 
 Putnam Transit
 RTC Transit Simmons "Lot A" Yard
 Roseville Transit
 Regional Transportation Commission of Washoe County
 Contractor for RTC RIDE buses in Reno and Sparks NV.
 SamTrans
 Contractor for services that cross the San Mateo County line to San Francisco
 San Benito County Transit
 San Mateo County Parks Shuttle
 Santa Clarita Transit
 San Joaquin RTD County Services
 Santa Maria Area Transit
 Santa Rosa CityBus
 Contractor for Santa Rosa Paratransit
 SEPTA CCT Connect (Philadelphia County)
 Skyline College Express
 South Coast British Columbia Transportation Authority (TransLink)
 St. John's, Newfoundland
 Thousand Oaks Transit
 TCaT (Tulare County Area Transit)
 Tulare Intermodal Express (TIME) Tulare, CA
 West Hollywood CityLine
 Union City Transit
 Valley Metro
 Contractor for Phoenix Dial-A-Ride
 WestCAT (Western Contra Costa County Transit)
 WHEELS (California)

References

External links
MV Transportation website

Bus transportation in the United States
Bus companies of the United States
Fairfield, California
Disability in the United States
Companies based in Solano County, California
Transportation companies based in Texas
Transportation companies based in California